was an old province of Japan in the area that is today the western part of Shimane Prefecture. It was sometimes called . Iwami bordered Aki, Bingo, Izumo, Nagato, and Suō provinces.

In the Heian period (794–1192) the capital was at modern-day Hamada. 
In the Kamakura period (1192–1333) the Masuda clan belonged to the Minamoto clan (Genji) and conquered Iwami Province. From the sixteenth century onwards it played an important role in the economic history of East Asia as a major source of silver.

History
During the Muromachi and Sengoku periods, the battles were very furious in this area.
At first, the Masuda clan was in alliance with the Ōuchi clan in neighboring Suō, but later the Masuda clan belonged to the Mōri clan in neighboring Aki.

Maps of Japan and Iwami Province were reformed in the 1870s when the prefecture system was introduced.  At the same time, the province continued to exist for some purposes.  For example, Iwami is explicitly recognized in treaties in 1894 (a) between Japan and the United States and (b) between Japan and the United Kingdom.

Historical districts
 Shimane Prefecture
 Ano District (安濃郡) - dissolved
 Kanoashi District (鹿足郡)
 Mino District (美濃郡) - dissolved
 Naka District (那賀郡) - dissolved
 Nima District (邇摩郡) - dissolved
 Ōchi District (邑智郡)

See also
 Japanese battleship Iwami
 Tatamigaura
 Iwami Ginzan Silver Mine
 Hamada Domain 
 Tsuwano Domain
 Seiyōdō Tomiharu (1733-1810), founder of the Iwami school of carving

Notes

References
 Nussbaum, Louis-Frédéric and Käthe Roth. (2005).  Japan encyclopedia. Cambridge: Harvard University Press. ;  OCLC 58053128
 Papinot, Edmond. (1910). Historical and Geographic Dictionary of Japan. Tokyo: Librarie Sansaisha. OCLC 77691250

External links 

 "Iwami Province" at JapaneseCastleExplorer.com
  Murdoch's map of provinces, 1903
 Masuda City Sightseeing website

Former provinces of Japan